Abdulateef Salah (born 23 March 1992) is a Qatari footballer who plays as a left back.

References

External links
 

Qatari footballers
1992 births
Living people
Al-Sailiya SC players
Al Ahli SC (Doha) players
Al-Shahania SC players
Muaither SC players
Qatar Stars League players
Qatari Second Division players
Association football defenders